Short Hair is the debut extended play by South Korean girl group AOA, It was released on June 19, 2014 by FNC Entertainment. "Short Hair" was released as the lead single.

Background and release
On May 25, 2014, AOA revealed that they were going to have a comeback in June with their first mini-album.

The song "Joa Yo!" was used to promote their first DVD and photobook "Hot Summer". It was released as the second single of the album on July 24, 2014.

Promotion
The promotions of the song "Short Hair" started on June 19, 2014, on M! Countdown. The song was also promoted on the shows, Music Bank, Music Core and Inkigayo.

Track listing

Charts

Sales and certifications

References

2014 EPs
AOA (group) EPs
Korean-language EPs
FNC Entertainment EPs